The 1945–46 season was Galatasaray SK's 42nd in existence and the club's 34th consecutive season in the Istanbul Football League.

Squad statistics

Squad changes for the 1945–1946 season
In:

Competitions

Istanbul Football League

Classification

Matches
Kick-off listed in local time (EEST)

Milli Küme Istanbul qualifying round

Classification

Matches

Istanbul Futbol Kupası

Matches

Friendly Matches

References
 Atabeyoğlu, Cem. 1453-1991 Türk Spor Tarihi Ansiklopedisi. page(155-159).(1991) An Grafik Basın Sanayi ve Ticaret AŞ
 Tekil, Süleyman. Dünden bugüne Galatasaray, (1983), page(88, 123-125, 184). Arset Matbaacılık Kol.Şti.
 Futbol vol.2. Galatasaray. Page: 565, 586. Tercüman Spor Ansiklopedisi. (1981)Tercüman Gazetecilik ve Matbaacılık AŞ.
 1940 Milli Küme Maçları. Türk Futbol Tarihi vol.1. page(81). (June 1992) Türkiye Futbol Federasyonu Yayınları.

External links
 Galatasaray Sports Club Official Website 
 Turkish Football Federation - Galatasaray A.Ş. 
 uefa.com - Galatasaray AŞ

Galatasaray S.K. (football) seasons
Turkish football clubs 1945–46 season
1940s in Istanbul